William H. Bailey may refer to:

 William H. Bailey (artist) (born 1930), artist
 William Henry Bailey (1831–1908), American author, lawyer, and statesman
 William Heap Bailey (1847–1926), British amateur footballer
 Harry Bailey (footballer) (William Henry Bailey, 1870–1930), English cricketer and association footballer
 William Bailey (Canadian politician) (1889–1975), Canadian politician
 William Bailey (South Carolina politician) (born 1962), South Carolina politician

See also
William Bailey (disambiguation)